Kingdoms and Castles is a city-building video game developed by Lion Shield and released on July 20, 2017 for Windows, macOS, and Linux. In the game, players build and grow a medieval town while defending it from dragons and vikings. The game received mixed to average reviews on release.

Gameplay
Kingdoms and Castles is a city-building game in a medieval setting. Players begin by placing down a castle on one of the game's islands, strategically placing it next to resources such as fertile land or iron deposits. The player has a limited number of peasants who perform jobs such as farming, building, and collecting lumber, and they can increase their number of peasants by building homes. The peasants must be fed, which can be accomplished by building farms and granaries that store the food. Other buildings include foresters who cut and replant trees for lumber, and quarries that can collect stone used to build larger homes. As the player progresses, they can begin taxing their peasants for gold, which can be used to pay workers and unlock new types of buildings. Disasters periodically happen in the kingdom such as an annual winter that destroys crops, lightning strikes that cause fires, and infectious plagues. Occasionally, enemies such as dragons, vikings, and ogres will attack the kingdom, and the player must construct defenses and recruit soldiers to fight off these threats.

Development
Kingdoms and Castles was developed by Lion Shield. They have said that the game was inspired by SimCity, Banished, and Stronghold. The game was supported via the crowdfunding website, Fig.

The game was released on July 20, 2017 on Windows, macOS, and Linux.

Reception
According to the review aggregator website Metacritic, Kingdoms and Castles received "mixed to average" reviews. Rock Paper Shotgun praised the artstyle, and felt as though gameplay was less complex than that of other city-building games. PC Gamer enjoyed watching buildings be constructed, and considered the game to lack significant "depth", but overall felt as though it was "perfectly enjoyable". Kotaku said that he was "hooked" on constructing buildings, and felt as though it traded accessibility for complexity.

References

External links 
 

2017 video games
City-building games
Crowdfunded video games
Fantasy video games set in the Middle Ages
Indie video games
Linux games
MacOS games
Single-player games
Windows games
Single-player video games